This is a list of 95 species in Cantharis, a genus of soldier beetles in the family Cantharidae.

 Cantharis allosensis Pic, 1924 f
 Cantharis alticola (LeConte, 1881) i g b
 Cantharis aneba McKey-Fender, 1951 i b
 Cantharis annularis Menetriez, 1836 f
 Cantharis antennalis (Marseul, 1864) f
 Cantharis ariasi (Mulsant, 1862) f
 Cantharis assimilis Paykull, 1798 f
 Cantharis atrata (Marseul, 1864) f
 Cantharis basithorax Pic, 1902 f
 Cantharis beckeri (Pic, 1902) f
 Cantharis beta Fender, 1951 i g
 Cantharis brevicornis (Kiesenwetter, 1852) f
 Cantharis brullei (Marseul, 1864) f
 Cantharis cedricola Wittmer, 1971 f
 Cantharis cornix (Abeille de Perrin, 1869) f
 Cantharis coronata Gyllenhal, 1808 f
 Cantharis corvina Moscardini, 1962 f
 Cantharis cretica Wittmer, 1971 f
 Cantharis cryptica Ashe, 1947 f
 Cantharis curtisi (Kirby in Richards, 1837) i
 Cantharis cypria (Marseul, 1864) f
 Cantharis darwiniana Sharp, 1867 f
 Cantharis decipiens Baudi, 1871 f
 Cantharis decolorans Brullé, 1832 f
 Cantharis delagrangei Delkeskamp, 1939 f
 Cantharis dissipata Gemminger, 1870 f
 Cantharis edentula Baudi, 1871 f
 Cantharis ephippigera (Brullé, 1832) f
 Cantharis europea Pic, 1921 f
 Cantharis falzonii Fiori, 1914 f
 Cantharis fidelis (LeConte, 1851) i g b
 Cantharis figurata Mannerheim, 1843 g b f
 Cantharis flavilabris Fallen, 1807 f
 Cantharis franciana Kiesenwetter, 1866 f
 Cantharis fusca Linnaeus, 1758 f
 Cantharis fuscipennis (Mulsant, 1862) f
 Cantharis gemina Dahlgren, 1974 f
 Cantharis grandicollis (LeConte, 1851) i g b
 Cantharis hellenica Heyden, 1883 f
 Cantharis ictaria Fiori, 1914 f
 Cantharis impressa (LeConte, 1851) i g
 Cantharis inculta Gene, 1839 f
 Cantharis instabilis Kiesenwetter, 1866 f
 Cantharis italica Fiori, 1914 f
 Cantharis kervillei Pic, 1932 f
 Cantharis lateralis Linnaeus, 1758 f
 Cantharis lecontei Fall, 1936 i g b
 Cantharis liburnica Depoli, 1912 f
 Cantharis livida Linnaeus, 1758 i g b f
 Cantharis loweri Pic, 1906 i g
 Cantharis marginella (LeConte, 1851) i g
 Cantharis merula Moscardini, 1862 f
 Cantharis monacha Moscardini, 1862 f
 Cantharis montana Stierlin, 1889 f
 Cantharis morio Fabricius, 1792 f
 Cantharis nevadensis Pic, 1908 f
 Cantharis nigra (De Geer, 1774) f
 Cantharis nigricans Muller, 1766 f
 Cantharis nigriceps b
 Cantharis nigricornis (Laporte de Castelnau, 1840) f
 Cantharis obscura Linnaeus, 1758 f
 Cantharis ochreata (Reiche, 1878) f
 Cantharis oregona (LeConte, 1866) i g b
 Cantharis pagana Rosenhauer, 1847 f
 Cantharis paganettii (Flach, 1907) f
 Cantharis palliata Gyllenhal, 1808 f
 Cantharis pallida Goeze, 1777 f
 Cantharis paludosa Fallen, 1807 f
 Cantharis paradoxa Hicker, 1960 f
 Cantharis paulinoi Kiesenwetter, 1870 f
 Cantharis pellucida Fabricius, 1792 f
 Cantharis peninsularis Fiori, 1914 f
 Cantharis pilsbryi Skinner, 1906 i g
 Cantharis praecox Gene, 1836 f
 Cantharis prusiensis (Marseul, 1864) f
 Cantharis pulicaria Fabricius, 1781 f
 Cantharis pyrenaea Pic, 1906 f
 Cantharis quadripunctata (Muller, 1776) f
 Cantharis reichei Mulsant, 1862 f
 Cantharis rufa Linnaeus, 1758 i g b f
 Cantharis rustica Fallen, 1807 f
 Cantharis schrammi Pic, 1907 f
 Cantharis seidlitzi Kiesenwetter, 1865 f
 Cantharis sicula Pic, 1906 f
 Cantharis simpliunguis (Blatchley, 1910) i g
 Cantharis smyrnensis (Marseul, 1864) f
 Cantharis terminata Faldermann, 1835 f
 Cantharis torretasoi Wittmer, 1935 f
 Cantharis transmarina (Motschulsky, 1860) i b
 Cantharis tristis Fabricius, 1797 f
 Cantharis tuberculata (LeConte, 1851) i g b
 Cantharis versicolor (Baudi, 1871) f
 Cantharis vittata Fabricius, 1792 i g
 Cantharis westwoodi (Kirby in Richards, 1837) i g
 Cantharis xanthoporpa Kiesenwetter, 1860 f

Data sources: i = ITIS, c = Catalogue of Life, g = GBIF, b = Bugguide.net, f = Fauna Europaea

References

Cantharis